An election to Dinefwr Borough Council was held in May 1979. It was preceded by the 1976 election and followed by the 1983 election. On the same day there was a UK General Election and elections to the other local authorities and community councils in Wales.

A small number of seats changed hands and it appeared that Plaid Cymru held the balance of power on the authority with Labour and the Independents winning a similar number of seats.

Results

Ammanford Town Ward 1 (one seat)

Ammanford Town Ward 2 (one seat)

Ammanford Town Ward 3 (one seat)

Ammanford Town Ward 4 (one seat)

Ammanford Town Ward 5 (one seat)

Betws (one seat)

Brynamman (one seat)

Cilycwm (one seat)

Cwmamman (three seats)

Cwmllynfell (one seat)

Cynwyl Gaeo and Llanwrda (one seat)

Glynamman (one seat)

Llandeilo Fawr North Ward (one seat)

Llandeilo Fawr South Ward (one seat)

Llandeilo Town (two seats)

Llanddeusant / Myddfai (one seat)

Llandovery Town (two seats)

Llandybie and Heolddu (three seats)

Llanegwad and Llanfynydd (one seat)

Llanfihangel Aberbythych and Llangathen (one seat)

Llangadog and Llansadwrn (one seat)

Llansawel and Talley (one seat)

Penygroes (two seats)

Saron (two seats)

References

1979
1979 Welsh local elections